The Sea Viper was a steel roller coaster at Sea World on the Gold Coast, Queensland, Australia.

History
On 17 September 1982, Sea World opened the Corkscrew roller coaster. The ride was the first to feature three inversions in Australia and the second roller coaster for the theme park (the Thrillseeker opened within the prior year). The Corkscrew was attributed to a 20% increase in attendance in the year after opening.

In 2005, Sea World approached Kumbak to develop a new train for the then Corkscrew roller coaster. Throughout 2009, the Corkscrew roller coaster was repainted from white to orange. In the middle of 2009, a sign appeared outside the attraction stating that Sea Viper, a "new ride experience", would be opening by summer. In November 2009, the Corkscrew roller coaster closed to allow the original Arrow Dynamics train to be replaced with a new low-profile train manufactured by KumbaK.

Sea Viper was closed in early 2014 for maintenance, however, it was announced on 17 July 2014 that its closure would be permanent.

Ride
The ride began with the train being sent down a small hill followed by a 180° turn to the right under the queue. A chain lift hill then took riders up to a height of  before going down another small hill followed by a larger 180° turn. The track then drops to near ground level and enters a vertical loop. The ride then continued to run parallel to the station and up a hill before descending down a curved drop and into the double corkscrews. The second corkscrew passes directly under the Sea World Monorail System before curving up and back over it. The train's speed was reduced in a brake run before arriving back in the station.

Gallery

References

External links
 Official webpage
 

Roller coasters in Australia
Roller coasters operated by Village Roadshow Theme Parks
1982 establishments in Australia